Michael Dormer may refer to:
 Michael Dormer (artist), American artist and television producer
 Sir Michael Dormer (lord mayor), Lord Mayor of London in 1541
 Michael Dormer (cricketer), New Zealand cricketer